The following is a list of the urban local bodies in the Indian state of Uttar Pradesh.

 Nagar Nigam - 17
 Nagar Palika Parishad - 200
 Nagar Panchayat - 541

List of Municipal Corporations (Nagar Nigams) in Uttar Pradesh 
There are currently 17 Municipal Corporations in Uttar Pradesh with 1360 wards. Shahjahanpur Nagar Nigam is the youngest Municipal Corporation in the state.

List of Nagar Palika Parishads (Municipalities) in Uttar Pradesh 
There are 200 Nagar Palika Parishads (NPP) in Uttar Pradesh.

List of Nagar Panchayats in Uttar Pradesh 
There are 541 Nagar Paachayats in Uttar Pradesh currently.

Overview (district wise list)

Elections

Elections to the urban local bodies in Uttar Pradesh are held once in five years, are conducted by Uttar Pradesh State Election Commission. Last elections was held in 2017 & next elections for urban local bodies are to be held in November -December 2022.

See also 
 Local government in India
 Municipal governance in India
 List of municipal corporations in India
 List of cities in India by population
 Uttar Pradesh State Election Commission

References 

Local government in Uttar Pradesh
Urban local bodies
Uttar Pradesh, urban local bodies